Oriental Weekly (東方報) is a Chinese language ethnic weekly newspaper, based in Calgary, Alberta. It was founded in 1981 to serve the growing Chinese population in Western Canada. Oriental Weekly is owned by Trend Media, parent company of another weekly Chinese newspaper, Trend Weekly (閒情報). Its publisher is Danny Chan, 30 years veteran of Chinese publishing in Canada.

Oriental Weekly is available every Thursday from authorized vendors, free of charge. Its key contents include community news, local news, and government news on federal, provincial and municipal levels.

See also
List of newspapers in Canada

References

External links
Official Website
Chinese-Canadian culture in Alberta
Chinese-language newspapers published in Canada
Newspapers published in Calgary
Weekly newspapers published in Alberta